Thorleif Halvorsen (born 9 May 1988 in Cape Town, South Africa) is a South African rugby union player for Rovigo Delta in the Top12 in Italy. He usually plays as a loose forward.

Rugby career

Boland Cavaliers

Halvorsen played for the Wellington-based  at youth level, representing them in the Under-19 Provincial Championships in 2006 and 2007 and in the Under-21 Provincial Championships in 2008 and 2009.

In 2010, he was included in their senior squad for the first time for their 2010 Currie Cup First Division campaign. He made a further two starts and three appearances as a replacement during the remainder of the campaign, helping Boland to finish in third position on the log to qualify for the title play-offs.

He made five appearances in the 2011 Vodacom Cup competition for a Boland side that finished sixth in the Southern Section of the competition before returning for his second Currie Cup campaign. He made three starts and four appearances as a replacement for them during the regular season, helping them to nine victories out of ten to finish top of the log.

He made a single appearance in the 2012 Vodacom Cup – starting in a 22–51 defeat to Western Cape rivals  – but made eight appearances as the team attempted to defend their Currie Cup title. After four appearances as a replacement in rounds two to five, he made four consecutive starts later in the season. It was a disappointing season for the defending champions, winning just three of their fourteen matches and finishing the season in sixth position.

He made a further three appearances, but the team's failed to pick up another victory and eventually finished bottom of the Southern Section log. He made a further six appearances in the 2013 Currie Cup First Division, his last matches in a Boland Cavaliers shirt.

Mogliano

Halvorsen moved to Italy to join National Championship of Excellence side Mogliano prior to the 2013–14 season. He immediately established himself as the first-choice number eight at Mogliano, starting 18 of their 22 matches during the season and scoring two tries. Mogliano finished in third position on the log and Halvorsen featured in their 19-22 and 30–31 defeats against Rovigo in the two-legged semi-final. In addition to the National Championship of Excellence, Halvorsen also made five appearances in the 2013–14 European Challenge Cup. His side had a poor season in Pool 2 of the competition, however, losing all six of their matches.

In the 2014–2015 season, Halvorsen made 16 appearances – including 14 starts – for Mogliano as the team once again finished in third position on the log. After scoring four tries during the regular season against Rovigo, San Donà, Lazio and Calvisano, he scored his fifth try of the season in the first leg of their semi-final play-off series against Calvisano. However, it wasn't enough as his side lost the match 15–30, and a 24–23 second leg victory wasn't enough to overturn the deficit, which meant Mogliano got eliminated at the semi-final stage for the second season in a row.

As in 2014–15, Halvorsen made 14 starts and two appearances off the bench in the 2015–2016 season. He contributed two tries over the course of the season, helping Mogliano reach the semi-finals for the third season in succession since he joined the club. However, his team was also eliminated at this stage for the third season in a row, losing 10–13 and 17–34 to Rovigo in the two legs of their semi-final play-off matches.

SWD Eagles

In June 2016, Halvorsen returned to South Africa, joining the George, Western Cape-based  during the 2016 Currie Cup qualification series.

References

South African rugby union players
Living people
1988 births
Rugby union players from Cape Town
Rugby union locks
Rugby union flankers
Rugby union number eights
Boland Cavaliers players
Mogliano Rugby players
SWD Eagles players